The Nikon Coolpix P7800 is a digital compact camera announced by Nikon on September 5, 2013.

It bases on the Nikon Coolpix P7700, i.e. same lens system, flash socket and the same functionality regarding to the excellent operating modes and connectivity: mini-HDMI, USB-2, PAL/NTSC, remote sensor, external flash and for GPS-devices, among them Nikon GP1 and Dawn di-GPS line. The mini-HDMI connection can only be used in playback mode to display photos and videos from memory; the camera does not output realtime viewfinder video or audio over the mini-HDMI connector. 

Additions and enhancements:
 the body has a bit more 'bumps' and 'bay windows' and some millimeters in depth and width as well as 7 grams more weight 
 slight bigger grip
 changed positions of some of the function keys
 an Electronic viewfinder (-3 to +1 dioptric adjustment) and a rotating 3,0" TFT LCD Monitor (921,000 dots)

References

http://www.dpreview.com/products/nikon/compacts/nikon_cpp7800/specifications

P7800
Cameras introduced in 2013